Kaʻau Crater is an extinct volcanic crater located on the island of Oahu in the U.S. state of Hawaii near Palolo Valley.

Geology 
Kaʻau Crater formed as a result of the Honolulu Volcanic Series, which were a set of eruptions from the Koʻolau Range. The HVS also created other tuff cones throughout Oahu such as Diamond Head.

Legends 
According to Hawaiian legend, the crater was formed when the demigod Maui tried pulling the islands of Oahu and Kauai together with a hook and line. Maui failed to do so due to the line snapping. The hook landed somewhere and created an indent, forming Kaʻau Crater.

The word "Kaʻau" comes from "Kaʻauhelemoa", which was the name of a supernatural chicken that lived in the same valley.

Hike 
The Kaʻau Crater Hike receives visitors every year. However, due to its hidden appearance, its popularity is overshadowed by other tuff cones in Honolulu.

See also 

 Honolulu Volcanics
 Koʻolau Range
 Cinder cone

References 

Tuff cones
Volcanoes of Hawaii
Geography of Honolulu County, Hawaii
Cinder cones of the United States